Rokeach or Rokach  (Hebrew for "apothecary", "perfume", "perfumer" or "pharmacist") is the surname of:

 Aharon Rokeach (1877–1957), the fourth Belzer rebbe
 Elazar Rokeach (c. 1176 – 1238), Talmudist and kabbalist
 Elazar Rokeach of Amsterdam, (c. 1665—1742), rabbi
 Israel Rokach (1886–1959), Israeli politician
 Joel Rokach (1909–1965), Italian–Israeli physicist and mathematician
 Lucy Rokach, English professional poker player
 Malka Rokeach, the first Belzer rebbetzin
 Milton Rokeach (1918–1988), Professor of social psychology
 Sholom Rokeach (1779–1855), the first Belzer rebbe
 Yehoshua Rokeach (1825–1894), the second Belzer rebbe
 Yehoshua Rokeach of Machnovka (born 1949), current Machnovka Rebbe
 Yissachar Dov Rokeach (born 1948), the fifth Belzer rebbe
 Yissachar Dov Rokeach (1854–1926), the third Belzer rebbe

Jewish surnames
Occupational surnames
Jewish families
Hebrew-language surnames